The Mira River (pronounced like the woman's name "Myra") is a Canadian river located in eastern Cape Breton Island, Nova Scotia.

The river's source is traced to a series of lakes clustered around Victoria Bridge near the boundary with Richmond County. It is also fed by the Salmon River. Flowing past the communities of Marion Bridge and Albert Bridge, the river discharges through the "Mira Gut" at the community of the same name into the Mira Bay.

Name
The Mi'kmaq name for the river was 'Sookakade,' meaning 'the silver-place.' One version of source of the river's name is that it was named after a French officer, Lieutenant M. de Mire, in the year 1746. Another source gives the name's origin as having been given by Portuguese fishermen and explorers who may have named it after a place south of Oporto in Portugal. By 1776 the name on maps was 'Miray' and 'Mire.'

Geology
The Mira River Valley is a dominant topographical feature of southeastern Cape Breton, extending from Framboise Cove northwards to about Marion Bridge and then sweeping eastwards to exit at Mira Bay. The river lies between 320 million year old Carboniferous formations to the north and 500 million year old Cambrian and Precambrian formations to the south. The highly eroded bedrock is covered by a thick layer of glacial till, sands and gravels deposited during the retreat of the last ice age some 15,000 years ago.

Lying in a long narrow valley, possibly along an old fault line, the lower reaches of the river have been dammed by glacial gravels to form a long lake. Along the lower two-thirds of the river, these glacial deposits also formed numerous peninsulas such as the one Mira River Provincial Park occupies. About three kilometres from the mouth of the Mira, the river narrows and cuts a valley through bedrock to reach the Atlantic Ocean.

The carboniferous bedrock to the north of the Mira includes numerous coal seams - evidence of the area's environment 300 million years ago. At that time shallow lakes, bays, swamps and coastal flood plains covered much of the region. Abundant fossils can be found in this coal. These coal seams supported the region's long history of coal mining. South of the Mira, fossils are also imbedded in the Cambrian sandstones and shales.

Marine environment
Along the southern part of its course, glacial deposits have interrupted the flow to form a chain of small lakes which are all less than 15 metres above sea level. Tidal waters move back and forth in the eastern portion of the river.

The waters of the Mira River support a variety of fish species including sea trout, shad, perch, American eel, striped bass, mackerel, herring, brook trout, speckled trout, minnows and smelt. Consequently, the river is popular for fishing.

Cultural environment
The river's width (on some old maps and in old Sailing Directions it is referred to as a lake) and calm waters make it ideal for pleasure boating and other recreational activities; numerous cottages line its banks. Several campgrounds and parks, along with the Mira Boat Club at Albert Bridge make the Mira River a vacation destination in the Cape Breton Regional Municipality. Popular swimming spots include Marion Bridge, Mira Gut Beach, Sangaree Island, Mira Water Park, and Albert Bridge.

The Mira region is also home to the Two Rivers Wildlife Park. According to estimates by the Province of Nova Scotia, there are 102,428 people resident within the Mira/Salmon River watershed in 2011.

In popular culture
The Mira River was the inspiration for local singer-songwriter Allister MacGillivray's Song for the Mira. Over the years, it has become a renowned folk song, that has been recorded by many artists and translated into several different languages.

Bridges

The Mira River is presently crossed by three road bridges, Victoria Bridge, carrying Grand Mira South Road, Marion Bridge carrying Nova Scotia Route 327, and Albert Bridge, carrying Nova Scotia Trunk 22, each bridge in their respective namesake communities. Over the years there have been several other bridges, conveying road or rail.

For over 140 years the mouth of the river was spanned by the Mira Gut Bridge, a swing bridge with a revolving middle span. First built as a railroad bridge for the Sydney and Louisburg Railway, and later converted to a road bridge carrying Mira Bay Drive, the bridge became structurally unsound, was deemed unrepairable by the Nova Scotia Department of Transportation and Infrastructure Renewal, and so was demolished and removed in November 2017. The Department of Transportation and Infrastructure Renewal is currently conducting research to determine options for replacing the bridge.

The Mira Gut Bridge, along with Albert Bridge, have been known to be used as diving boards by youths seeking adventure. The activity has not been as prevalent in recent years due to public fears of injury and liability, and to threats made by the Cape Breton Regional Police of fines or jail time for jumpers.  The Gut bridge was used due to the high currents experienced at mid tide.  Albert Bridge was used due to its height above water and the deep pool situated below the northwestern end of the bridge.

See also
List of rivers of Nova Scotia

References

External links
 
 A chart of a section of the Mira River, between Marion & Albert Bridges

Landforms of the Cape Breton Regional Municipality
Rivers of Nova Scotia
Landforms of Cape Breton County